Santiago el Pinar is a town and one of the 119 Municipalities of Chiapas, in southern Mexico.

As of 2010, the municipality had a total population of 3,245, up from 2,174 as of 2005. It covers an area of 17.76 km².

As of 2010, the town of Santiago el Pinar had a population of 1,072. Other than the town of Santiago el Pinar, the municipality had 12 localities, none of which had a population over 1,000.

References

Municipalities of Chiapas